Doctor Jim is a 1947 American drama film directed by Lew Landers and starring Stuart Erwin.

Oscar P. Yerg served as the art director for the film. Ben Winkler served as the sound engineer for the film.

Cast
Stuart Erwin as Dr. James Gateson
Barbara Woodell as Sally Gateson
William Wright as Dr. Sylvester
Hobart Cavanaugh as Mayor
Netta Packer as Emily
William Schallert as George Brant 
William Newell as Editor
Gloria Grant as Camille

References

External links 

1947 films
Films directed by Lew Landers